Marc Mayer (born 18 July 1978) is an Austrian cross-country skier. He competed in the men's sprint event at the 2002 Winter Olympics.

References

External links
 

1978 births
Living people
Austrian male cross-country skiers
Olympic cross-country skiers of Austria
Cross-country skiers at the 2002 Winter Olympics
Sportspeople from Salzburg